Lake Babine Nation (also Nataotin, Nat'oot'en Nation) is a Babine band government, historically located on the banks of Babine Lake in central British Columbia, Canada. Its main community has been in Woyenne, near Burns Lake, since many of the nation's members moved there in the 1940s. Other year-round communities include Tachet on the central part of Babine Lake and Wit'at (Fort Babine) at the end of the northwest arm of the lake. Seasonal communities include Nedo'ats (Old Fort) at the north end of the lake and Donald's Landing (Pinkut Nation) toward the south end.

The nation consists of roughly 2,000 members, living both on and off reserve. Its traditional language is Babine-Witsuwit'en, a Northern Athabaskan language. It was initially created in December 1957 by legislation from the Department of Indian and Northern Affairs Canada which amalgamated the Fort Babine and Old Fort Bands. It is currently at stage 4 of the British Columbia Treaty Negotiation Process.

Woyenne, with approximately 940 residents, is adjacent to the community of Burns Lake, British Columbia, but has its own preschool, kindergarten, daycare, and adult learning centre. The Nation's main band office is located in Woyenne.

Wit'at (Fort Babine) has approximately 60 permanent residents, an elementary school, a health clinic, a water treatment plant and a satellite band office. Because the forced amalgamation in the 1950s, there has been a separation movement in the community of Wit'at. In fact, some people in this community will refer to themselves as "Wit'at Nation."

Tachet also has approximately 130 permanent residents, a satellite band office, a water treatment plant and a convenience store.

Clans
The Lake Babine Nation has traditionally comprised four clans:
 Jilh tsekh xu (Frog)
 Likh c’ bu (Bear)
 Likh tsa mis xu (Beaver)
 Gilanton (Cariboo)

References

Indian and Northern Affairs Canada First Nation profile

Further reading 
 Patrick, Betty & Fiske, Jo-Anne, Cis Dideen Kat (When the Plumes Rise): The Way of the Lake Babine Nation (UBC Press, 2000).

External links
 BC Treaty Commission - Lake Babine Nation 
 Official Homepage - Under Construction

Babine
Dakelh governments
Omineca Country